Tule fog is a thick ground fog that settles in the San Joaquin Valley and Sacramento Valley areas of California's Central Valley. Tule fog forms from late fall through early spring (California's winter season) after the first significant rainfall. The official time frame for tule fog to form is from November 1 to March 31. This phenomenon is named after the tule grass wetlands (tulares) of the Central Valley. Tule fog is the leading cause of weather-related accidents in California.

Formation
Tule fog is a radiation fog, which condenses when there is a high relative humidity (typically after a heavy rain), calm winds, and rapid cooling during the night.  The nights are longer in the winter months, which allows an extended period of ground cooling, and thereby a pronounced temperature inversion at a low altitude.

Tule fog occasionally drifts as far west as the San Francisco Bay Area via the Carquinez Strait, and can even drift westward out through the Golden Gate, opposite to the usual course of the coastal fog.

Tule fog is characteristically confined mainly to the Central Valley due to the mountain ranges surrounding it. Because of the density of the cold air in the winter, winds are not able to dislodge the fog and the high pressure of the warmer air above the mountaintops presses down on the cold air trapped in the valley, resulting in a dense, immobile fog that can last for days or at times for weeks undisturbed. Tule fog often contains light drizzle or freezing drizzle where temperatures are sufficiently cold.

Tule fog is a low cloud, usually below  in altitude and can be seen from above by driving up into the foothills of the Sierra Nevada to the east or the Coast Ranges to the west. Above the cold, foggy layer, the air is typically mild, dry and clear.  Once tule fog has formed, turbulent air is necessary to break through the temperature inversion layer.  Daytime heating (cloud-penetrating visible light wavelengths transformed to infrared by the ground)  sometimes evaporates the fog in patches, although the air remains chilly and hazy below the inversion and fog reforms soon after sunset.  Tule fog usually remains longer in the southern and eastern parts of the Central Valley, because winter storms with strong winds and turbulent air affect the northern Central Valley more often.

Visibility

Visibility in tule fog is usually less than an eighth of a mile (about 600 ft or 200 m).

The variability in visibility is the cause of many chain-reaction pile-ups on roads and freeways. In one such accident on Interstate 5 near Elk Grove south of Sacramento, 25 cars and nine big-rig trucks collided inside a fog bank on December 12, 1997. Five people died and 28 were injured. It took 26 hours to clear away all the wreckage and reopen the freeway. In February 2002, two people were killed in an 80-plus-car pile-up on State Route 99 between Kingsburg and Selma. On the morning of November 3, 2007, heavy tule fog caused a massive pile-up that included 108 passenger vehicles and 18 big-rig trucks on northbound State Route 99 between Fowler and Fresno. There were two fatalities and 39 injuries in the crash.

Freezing drizzle and black ice 
Tule fog events are often accompanied by drizzle. Sunlight cannot penetrate the fog layer, keeping temperatures below freezing. Episodes of freezing drizzle occasionally accompany tule fog events during winter.  Such events can leave an invisible glaze of black ice on roadways, making travel especially treacherous.

Composition 
Besides water droplets, the composition of tule fog in the San Joaquin and Sacramento valleys includes ammonia, nitrate and sulfate concentrations. Furthermore, ammonia is the most commonly found single ion and usually is measured to be more than half of the measured ions in the fog. Depending on the region within the California Central Valley, the composition of tule fog can vary in element or ion concentrations.

As of 2014, it has been discovered that the quantity of tule fog has decreased in the Central Valley from when it was initially studied from 1981-1999 compared to 2001-2012. The frequency of tule fog occurrence is proportional to the higher air pollution in California. Minimum temperature, DPD (the difference between ambient temperature and dew point), precipitation, and wind speed are the four major components that affect fog formation. Minimum temperature affects tule fog formation because it is an extreme form of radiation fog that most often forms after sunset due to rapid surface radiative cooling. Low DPD is consistent with more frequent periods of fog. Precipitation has somewhat of a correlation to an increase in fog however it is not directly correlated due to some precipitation totals being inversely correlated to some fog years. Wind speed has a small but statistically important impact on fog frequency being that lower wind speeds are correlated with higher fog frequency.

Winter causes the optimal meteorological conditions for fog formation due to periodic storms followed by long periods of high pressure throughout California.

References

External links

Page on tule fog  from the National Oceanic and Atmospheric Administration (NOAA)
University Corporation for Atmospheric Research: Forecasting Radiation Fog 
Davis, CA Tule fog  — featured in Orion Magazine.

Fog
Natural history of the Central Valley (California)
Climate of California
Weather events in the United States